The Pulitzer Prize for Audio Reporting is one of the Pulitzer Prizes for American journalism. It recognizes distinguished reporting on a radio program or podcast.

History
The award was announced in December 2019, and given for the first time in 2020.

List of winners

2020s
2020: Staff of This American Life with Molly O'Toole of the Los Angeles Times and Emily Green, freelancer, Vice News, for "'The Out Crowd,' revelatory, intimate journalism that illuminates the personal impact of the Trump Administration's 'Remain in Mexico' policy."
Andrew Beck Grace, Chip Brantley, Graham Smith, Nicole Beemsterboer and Robert Little of NPR, for "White Lies, a riveting seven-episode podcast that doggedly reinvestigated one of the most infamous murders of the Civil Rights era."
Nigel Poor, Earlonne Woods and Rahsaan Thomas for "Ear Hustle, a consistently surprising and beautifully crafted series on life behind bars produced by inmates of San Quentin State Prison."
2021: Lisa Hagen and Chris Haxel, of NPR, for No Compromise, "an investigative series on 'no compromise' gun rights activists that illuminated the profound differences and deepening schism between American conservatives."
 2022 Staffs of Futuro Media, New York, and PRX, Boston, for Suave, "a brutally honest and immersive profile of a man reentering society after serving more than 30 years in prison."

References

Audio Reporting
American radio awards
Podcasting awards
Awards established in 2020